Emil Filipčič (born 8 April 1951) is a Slovene writer, playwright and actor. He is known for his novels, short stories and dramas and has also appeared as an actor in numerous theatre productions in Slovenia.

Filipčič was born in Belgrade in 1951. He studied at the Academy for Theatre, Radio, Film and Television in Ljubljana and works as a freelance writer, actor, playwright and director. In 2011 he won the Prešeren Foundation Award for his novel Problemi (Problems).

Selected works

 Grein Vaun, novel, (1979)
 Kerubini (Cherubins), satirical novel co-written with Branko Gradišnik under the single pseudonym Jožef Paganel
 Kuku, novel, (1985)
 Ervin kralj, novel, (1986)
 X-100, novel, (1988)
 Orangutan, short stories (1992)
 Dobri robotek, short stories (1993)
 Urugvaj 1930, novel, (1993)
 Jesen je, novel, (1995)
 Izlet v naravo, short stories (1997)
 Keopsova piramida, novel, (2005)
 Problemi, novel, (2009)

Plays

 Kegler, drama (1981)
 Ujetniki svobode, drama (1982)
 Altamira, satirical comedy (1982)
 Bolna nevesta , satirical comedy (1984)
 Kako naj odgovorim spoštovanemu tovarišu Francetu Piberniku?, drama (1985)
 Atlantida, drama (1988)
 Božanska tragedija, drama (1989)
 Psiha, comedy (1993)
 Veselja dom, drama (1996)

References

Writers from Belgrade
Slovenian dramatists and playwrights
Slovenian male stage actors
Living people
1951 births
University of Ljubljana alumni